Southern Charm is an American reality television series aired on Bravo that debuted on  March 3, 2014. The series focuses on several socialites as they socialize and navigate their personal lives in Charleston, South Carolina.

Series overview

Episodes

Season 1 (2014)
Craig Conover, Cameran Eubanks, Jenna King, Thomas Ravenel, Shep Rose, and Whitney Sudler-Smith are introduced as series regulars.

Season 2 (2015)
King departed as a series regular. Kathryn Calhoun Dennis and Landon Clements are introduced as series regulars.

Season 3 (2016)

Season 4 (2017)
Sudler-Smith departed as a series regular. Austen Kroll joins the main cast.

Season 5 (2018)
Clements departed as a series regular. Chelsea Meissner joins the main cast.

Season 6 (2019)
Ravenel departed as a series regular. Eliza Limehouse and Naomie Olindo are added to the main cast.

Season 7 (2020–21)
Eubanks, Meissner, Limehouse, and Olindo departed the series. Leva Bonaparte, Madison LeCroy, and John Pringle are added to the main cast.

Season 8 (2022)
Naomie Olindo returned as a series regular. Venita Aspen, Taylor Ann Green, Olivia Flowers and Chleb Ravenell joined the main cast.

References

External links
 
 
 

Southern Charm